Pendrift is a hamlet north of Blisland in Cornwall, England.

References

Hamlets in Cornwall